The 2012 European Junior Judo Championships is an edition of the European Junior Judo Championships, organised by the European Judo Union.It was held in Poreč, Croatia from 21 to 23 September 2012.

Medal summary

Medal table

Men's events

Women's events

Source Results

References

External links
 

 U21
European Junior Judo Championships
European Championships, U21
Judo
Judo
Judo, World Championships U21